Ischnogasteroides is an Afrotropical and Palearctic genus of potter wasps. It currently includes the following species:

 Ischnogasteroides annae (Kostylev, 1939)
 Ischnogasteroides carinatus (Kostylev, 1939)
 Ischnogasteroides flavus Magretti, 1884
 Ischnogasteroides gracillimus (Giordani Soika, 1941)
 Ischnogasteroides leptogaster (Walker, 1871)
 Ischnogasteroides picteti (Saussure, 1852) 
 Ischnogasteroides tenuissimus (Giordani Soika, 1941)
 Ischnogasteroides zarudnyi (Kostylev, 1939)

References

 Carpenter, J.M., J. Gusenleitner & M. Madl. 2010a. A Catalogue of the Eumeninae (Hymenoptera: Vespidae) of the Ethiopian Region excluding Malagasy Subregion. Part II: Genera Delta de Saussure 1885 to Zethus Fabricius 1804 and species incertae sedis. Linzer Biologischer Beitrage 42 (1): 95-315.

Potter wasps
Hymenoptera genera